Manuel A. Esteva Ruiz (1878 – December 16, 1936) was the Consul General of Mexico to the United States in 1914 during the Mexican Revolution.

See also
Foreign relations of Mexico
Mexico-United States relations

References

1878 births
1936 deaths
Mexican diplomats
Place of birth missing
Mexican expatriates in the United States